Palmerston North Intermediate Normal School (commonly known as PNINS - said PIN-INS) is a state coeducational intermediate school for year seven and year eight, boys and girls located in the central area of Palmerston North, New Zealand.

Students are placed in a composite class on the first day of Year 7 where they will remain for the two years of their time at the school. As of 2013, there is now a quite high chance of moving teams/classes at the end of the year.

Sports Exchange 
The school has an annual sports exchange with Hawera Intermediate school and an annual performing arts exchange with Taradale Intermediate school.

PNINS are also a regular participant at the AIMS Games in Tauranga each year.

History 
The school was founded in 1941.

The building was used as a military hospital in World War II for wounded soldiers. And many of the doors in the main building were double hinged to allow stretchers to be transported more easily, most still remain.

Notable students
 Trevor de Cleene (1933–2001), former MP representing Palmerston North 
 Kayla Sharland,  former Black Sticks captain, married to George Whitelock. (See below)
 Levi Sherwood, Freestyle motocross rider
 Sam Whitelock, All Black
 Nick Wilson, Men's Black Stick
 Aaron Cruden, All Black
 Luke Whitelock, All Black
 George Whitelock, All Black
 Adam Milne, Black Cap
 Jeremy Corbett Comedian
 Alex Rufer, Wellington Phoenix Football Team
 Jacob Oram, Black Cap
 Emily Naylor, Black Stick

 John Clarke, Comedian sometimes known as Fred Dagg
 Georgia Barnett, Black Stick

References

Educational institutions established in 1941
Intermediate schools in New Zealand
Schools in Palmerston North
1941 establishments in New Zealand